The Monastery of the Transfiguration of Christ the Saviour, commonly known as the Soteros or Saviour Monastery (Μονή Σωτήρος) or as the Batheos Rhyakos Monastery (Μονή του Βαθέως Ρύακος), was a Byzantine-era monastery near modern Tirilye in Turkey (medieval Trigleia in Bithynia). The complex now lies ruined, although some buildings are used as animal shelters.

Byzantine church buildings in Turkey
Byzantine Bithynia
Greek Orthodox monasteries in Turkey
Buildings and structures in Bursa Province